XHNX-FM is a radio station in Toluca, State of México. It is one of several stations in the State of Mexico known as Super Stereo Miled.

History
XHNX went on air at 6pm on October 28, 1968, making it the first FM station in the State of Mexico. Miled Libien Kahue formally received its concession on November 30, 1971.

References

Regional Mexican radio stations
Radio stations in the State of Mexico